Vararamachandrapuram, (or V.R.Puram) is a village in Alluri Sitharama Raju district of Andhra Pradesh, India.

Demographics
According to Indian census, 2001, the demographic details of Vararamachandrapuram mandal is as follows:
 Total Population: 	23,411	in 5,741 Households.		
 Male Population: 	11,731	and Female Population: 	11,680	
 Children Under 6-years of age: 3,581	(Boys - 1,799	and Girls -	1,782)
 Total Literates: 	8,411

References 

Villages in Alluri Sitharama Raju district